Mauna Loa Estates is an unincorporated community and census-designated place (CDP) in Hawaii County, Hawaii, United States. It is on the eastern side of Kilauea on the island of Hawaii and is bordered to the north, across Hawaii Route 11, by the community of Volcano.

Mauna Loa Estates was first listed as a CDP prior to the 2020 census.

Demographics

References 

Census-designated places in Hawaii County, Hawaii
Census-designated places in Hawaii
Unincorporated communities in Hawaii County, Hawaii